The music of Niue has a long history. Niue is a Polynesian island in the South Pacific. Though independent, it is in free association with New Zealand.

History
The Niue culture and tradition is also rich in music. However, most of the very traditional Niuean songs are sung without the use of any musical instruments. The use of the instrument is mainly to provide a beat for the dances.

Tame
The tame involves singing with guitars, ukuleles and sometimes using a musical keyboard. It accompanies a dance that has different actions to go with the meaning of the song. Both men and women dance together in a tame. Most of the time the women will dance while sitting down while the men dance while standing. However, this has nothing to do with status, as Niue women and men have equal status in the Niue society.

Today
As Niue modernized, its music began to be influenced by other cultures. Manaia Studio and the Niue Broadcasting Corporation are the only recording studios on the island. There are many Niue artists who have made it to the top. But Pauly Fuemana of OMC (Otara's Millionaires Club) is half Niuean and half Māori, became the first New Zealander to reach the top of the charts in 12 countries with his hit "How Bizarre" which sold over 3 million albums which makes him the most successful Pacific music artist ever. The Fuemana Family is the most successful Pacific family with over 12 NZ music awards between. The musician Che Fu is very popular, and has won several Tui Awards, a New Zealand music award. This is an enormous achievement for a country with only a few thousand people, as other countries bigger than Niue have yet to reach those heights conquered by these Niuean artists. The Kilakokonut Krew group and record label is also made up of Niuean artists Vela Manusaute and Glen Jackson.  The migration of Niueans to New Zealand also make greater influences on Niuean music.  There are up-and-coming artists, such as MC Kava, who now sing in contemporary styles of music like rap, hip-hop and reggae. 

There are also many Niuean artists who have produced records in Niuean language, groups like Island Pride (J'Love Hekesi), Glen JXN Jackson), PNG Highlanders, Salekiu Tusini, Niupila Billy Hunuki, Napoleon and the Lost Liku Lovers, Niue Arts Festival Group, TA5 (music), Manu Folau, Moana Lukeluke, Tony.T & Ian Hipa, Nu Beat & Tama Niue Mooli and a lot of other artists to name. Fuata Muta was the first Niuean group to play and record their own music albums. From the actual playing of the instruments to the engineering and mixing the songs at one of Sydney's largest recording studios in 1985 and 1986. Church choirs are also common. However, they sing traditional hymns with no instrumental accompaniment at all.

Niueans are talented people who have charted and Include Harry Uasi Leki who was originally from the Village of Hakupu, who was in a band in the 1960s called "Simple Image" , which had 4 Chart topping hits including "Spinning Spinning Spinning" . Feau Halatau from the Village of Hakupu, was a founding member and drummer of "The Radars" , he was known to be partially blind and this group won a TVNZ Music award in the 1970s-1980s. Tyree Tautogia was part of the NZ hip hop group called Smashproof, he is also a person of Niuean ancestry and descent. Tony Fuemana aka OMC, a Niuean descendant from the village of Mutalau topped the charts in 12 countries and won a few awards in New Zealand. Che Fu Ness topped the charts also and has won a few awards in New Zealand. Tony T aka Tony Nogotautama from the village of Hakupu, was part of the famous band Ardijah and D - Faction, which released the popular cover "Down in the Boondocks" . 

Three Niuean LPs have been released on Vinyl which were pressed when Niueans travelled for the South Pacific Arts Festivals in Suva & Rotorua. Many Niuean Cassette Tapes and CDs have been produced and made over the years in Australia, New Zealand and Niue. 

Victa Talima released a cassette tape in Sydney, Australia. It was called "Neva" and was released in 1997. It included his cult classic remake of Titania Talagi's hit "Koe Fisi Siale" and pretty popular among Niueans in the world. He released two CDs, one called "Hihina Mata" (2000) and "Vela" (2006) with moderate success and with some popular tunes. His song "Tolitoli" from the Hihina Mata album was one of the First Niuean songs to be banned from Niuean Radio station BCN for its explicit lyrics. 

Niue had a Recording studio called Manaia Studios, which produced a few artists famous to Niueans they included, Malakava Sisters (Daughters of Titania and Matalose Talagi; they sung the cult classic "Tama Afine Niue" and covered popular hits "Koe Auro Moe Alio" , Teuila and Frances (Sung the song "Fakatai a Susana" ), Sionepaea Kumitau (Sung the songs "Haku Loto Paiki" & "Fano Au He Tau" , Bommo & Co (Kimray Vaha), Falala Niue (Compilation of songs for the 1999 Miss Niue pageant, includes popular hits "Alito Mata He Fuata" ; This was sung by Coral Pasisi & Jackson Hekesi. this song  was composed for Miss Fiafia Rex, written by Tagaloa Rex Cooper. "Falala Mai Fineone" sung by the Hakupu Youth. Tomanogi (Husband and wife Duo Tom & Ligimanogi Misikea, composer of the popular Huvalu Forest Conservation party song "Ta Kalali")

Ta Kalali has been covered a few times, Jolly Talima & The Talima Band, covered this song for the Çyclone Heta album. Jackson Hekesi (J'love) covered this song for his 'Blast from the Past' album.

Napoleon Manetoa & The Lost Liku Lovers, released the CD 'Neva' ; It included many known hits and a few new songs never heard before. It included the tracks  Pa pa Seliga, Ko E Kufani, Kua Amanaki and many more.

Other Niuean groups or artists to release music are Kuma Mo Feke, Mefi Fifita, Malcolm Lakatani, Sheelagh Cooper, James Viliua, Tina Tuibenau, Brad Etuata, Annette Posimani, Jayjay Poumale. 

Niue
Niue
Niuean culture